Makola is a town in the Greater Accra Region of Ghana. It houses one of the largest trading centres in Ghana – Makola Market – and the premiere campus of the Ghana School of Law.

References

Populated places in the Greater Accra Region